Robert-Hugues Lambert (1 April 1908 – 7 March 1945) was a French actor. He was active in film in 1943. A homosexual man, he was arrested in a gay bar by German troops in 1943 and died of exhaustion in  Flossenbürg concentration camp two months before the end of the Second World War.

Filmography
 (1943)

References

External links

1908 births
1945 deaths
Male actors from Paris
French male stage actors
French male film actors
20th-century French male actors
French gay actors
French civilians killed in World War II
French people who died in Nazi concentration camps
Buchenwald concentration camp survivors
People who died in Flossenbürg concentration camp
20th-century LGBT people